The 1995 NAIA World Series was the 39th annual tournament hosted by the National Association of Intercollegiate Athletics to determine the national champion of baseball among its member colleges and universities in the United States and Canada.

The tournament was played for at Lewis and Clark Park in Sioux City, Iowa. This was the first tournament played in Sioux City since 1961.

Emerging out of the consolation bracket, Bellevue (57–13) defeated Cumberland (TN) (49–19) in a single-game championship series, 8–5, to win the Bruins' first NAIA World Series.

Bellevue short-stop Nic DeLuca was named tournament MVP.

Bracket

See also
 1995 NCAA Division I baseball tournament
 1995 NCAA Division II baseball tournament
 1995 NCAA Division III baseball tournament
 1995 NAIA Softball World Series

Reference

|NAIA World Series
NAIA World Series
NAIA World Series
NAIA World Series